Allocnemis contraria is a species of white-legged damselfly in the family Platycnemididae.

The IUCN conservation status of Allocnemis contraria is "LC", least concern, with no immediate threat to the species' survival. The IUCN status was reviewed in 2010.

References

Further reading

 

Platycnemididae
Articles created by Qbugbot
Insects described in 1951